Örgryte Church may refer to:

Örgryte Old Church
Örgryte New Church